Bohunice is a village and municipality in the Levice District in the Nitra Region of south-west Slovakia.

History
In historical records the village was first mentioned in 1270.

Geography
The village lies at an altitude of 271 metres and covers an area of 12.883 km2.
It has a population of about 155 people.

Genealogical resources

The records for genealogical research are available at the state archive "Statny Archiv in Nitra, Slovakia"

 Roman Catholic church records (births/marriages/deaths): 1688-1898 (parish B)
 Lutheran church records (births/marriages/deaths): 1717-1895 (parish A)

See also
 List of municipalities and towns in Slovakia

External links
https://web.archive.org/web/20071116010355/http://www.statistics.sk/mosmis/eng/run.html
Surnames of living people in Bohunice

Villages and municipalities in Levice District